Hans Peder Pedersen-Dan (1 August 1859 – 21 April 1939) was a Danish sculptor.

Early life and education
Pedersen-Dan was born at Itzehoe in Schleswig-Holstein. He was the son of Ole Pedersen (1820-1902) and Elisabeth Sofie Johansen (1821-1890). After completing his stonemason's apprenticeship, he set out as a journeyman in 1878 to travel Europe. He lived in Rome between 1881 and 1887. He studied at the Royal Danish Academy of Fine Arts of Copenhagen where he was awarded a gold metal in 1898. In 1890 he received the Academy scholarship and next year he spent in Paris.

Career
Pedersen-Dans created a number of well-known sculptures. These include the Little Horn-Blower at City Hall Square in Copenhagen (bronze, 1899), the four granite elephants of the Elephant Gate at the Ny Carlsberg brewery in Valby (1901) and a statue of Ogier the Dane for the romantic gardens at Marienlyst House (bronze 1907). The latter was later re-cast in artificial stone at placed in the dungeons underneath Kronborg Castle.

He also designed a monument to Danish volunteers in World War I in Rueil-Malmaison in France and the four statues of queens of the Queens Gate at the new Christiansborg Palace.

Personal life
Pedersen-Dan was married to Johanne Pedersen-Dan (1860–1934) who was an actress before she also turned to sculpturing, in 1888, training under Stephan Sinding. The couple adopted a girl, Rigmor. They lived in Hvidovre Rytterskole in Hvidovre from 1912. He became a Knight of the Order of the Dannebrog in 1898. He died at Hellerup in 1939.

Works
 Michael Drewsen, Silkeborg, (1892)
 The Little Horn-Blower, City Hall Square, Copenhagen (1899)
 Carlsberg Elephants, Carlsberg, Copenhagen (1901)
 Hans Rostgaard, Krogerup Højskole, Helsingør (1904)
 Holger Danske, Kronborg Castle / Skjern (1907)
 A Mother, Hvidovre, Copenhagen (bronze, 1908)
 Christian IX, Nyborg, Denmark (bronze, 1908)
 Christian IX, Christiansborg Palace, Copenhagen (marble, 1908)
 Monument to Danish World War I Volunteers, Rueil-Malmaison, France
 Ismael, Aarhus (1934)

Gallery

See also
 List of Danish sculptors

References

Further reading
 Toftemark , Eva: Hyldest til en moder : billedhuggeren H.P. Pedersen-Dan og hans kunst'' (48 pages)

1859 births
1939 deaths
People from Itzehoe
Royal Danish Academy of Fine Arts alumni
19th-century Danish sculptors
20th-century Danish sculptors
Male sculptors
Knights of the Order of the Dannebrog
Danish male artists
19th-century Danish male artists
20th-century Danish male artists